Gabrijel Radić is a Serbian volleyball player, currently playing for NIS Vojvodina Novi Sad.

Previous teams

2000–2004 year, NIS Vojvodina Novi Sad–Novi Sad (SRB)

2004–2005 year, EAP PATRA Volleyball Club- GRECE

2005–2006 year, V.C "SPOLETO"–A2 ( ITA )

2006–2007 year, VC Iskra Odintsovo–(RUSSIA)

2007–2008 year, Aris Volleyball Club–Thessaloniki (GRE)

2008–2009 year, V.C "Milonas" - (GRE)

2009–2010 year, NIS Vojvodina Novi Sad (SRB)

2010–2011 year, Lamia Volleyball Club- GRE

2011–2012 year, Cambrai Volleyball Club- FRANCE

2012–2013 year, Martigues VC- FRANCE

Titles

Best middle blocker of Greek Championship for season 2007–08

National team

25 matches in Junior National Team of Serbia

30 matches in Senior National Team of Serbia

References

1982 births
Living people
Serbian men's volleyball players
Sportspeople from Novi Sad
Serbian expatriate sportspeople in Greece
Serbian expatriate sportspeople in Italy
Serbian expatriate sportspeople in Russia
Serbian expatriate sportspeople in France